Shalom Shalomzon (27 September 1919 – 1 November 1975) was an Israeli footballer who played as a full-back for Maccabi Tel Aviv.

Shalomzon made his senior international debut in Mandatory Palestine's last international match against Lebanon in 1940; he also represented Israel in 1948.

References

External links
 Shalom Shalomzon at maccabipedia.co.il
 

1919 births
1975 deaths
Romanian emigrants to Mandatory Palestine
Jewish Israeli sportspeople
Jewish Romanian sportspeople
Jewish footballers
Association football fullbacks
Mandatory Palestine footballers
Israeli footballers
Mandatory Palestine international footballers
Israel international footballers
Maccabi Tel Aviv F.C. players